Yu Shulong (born February 19, 1990 in Jilin, China) is a Chinese professional basketball player. He currently plays for the Sichuan Blue Whales of the Chinese Basketball Association.  He is also a member of the Chinese national basketball team.

Professional career
Yu debuted for the Jilin Northeast Tigers in the 2009–10 CBA season.  He averaged 11.3 points, 2.5 rebounds, and 2.4 assists per game in 31 games for the Tigers.  He was named to the Northern Rookie All-Star Team at the All-Star weekend Rookie Challenge, where he scored a team high 18 points.

On October 31, 2014 he was signed by the Sichuan Blue Whales. During his second season with Sichuan, he'd help the Blue Whales earn their first ever CBA Finals championship.

Chinese national team
Yu is also a member of the Chinese national basketball team.  After competing for the junior national team at various levels of competition, he was named to the senior team for the first time at the 2010 FIBA World Championship in Turkey.

References

1990 births
Living people
Point guards
Shooting guards
Basketball players from Changchun
Chinese men's basketball players
Jilin Northeast Tigers players
Shenzhen Leopards players
Sichuan Blue Whales players
2010 FIBA World Championship players